Günəşli, (until 2008, Azərbaycan, Azerbagdzhan, and Azerbaydzhan) is a village and municipality in the Lerik Rayon of Azerbaijan.  It has a population of 1,022.  The municipality consists of the villages of Günəşli and Babagil.

The village's prior name, "Azərbaycan", means "Azerbaijan" in the Azerbaijani language.

Waterfall
The Guneshli waterfall is a waterfall in Günəşli located at the depth of the dense forest. On May 8, 2007, by the decision of the National Assembly of the Republic of Azerbaijan the village included in the administrative territory of Noda village of Lerik region was named Guneshli. Guneshli waterfall is located at a height of 1000m above sea level. The height of Guneshli waterfall is 7 meters and its width is 5 meters The Gunashli waterfall swiftly flows and is divided into tributaries called Varazu and Vizazamin separately. These two tributaries together are called Lerikrivers.

See also 
 Qələbin Waterfall
 Mamirli waterfall (Azerbaijan)

References

External links

Populated places in Lerik District
Waterfalls of Azerbaijan